Mirbelia aotoides is a species of flowering plant in the family Fabaceae and is endemic to Queensland. It is a softly-hairy shrub with narrowly linear leaves with their edges rolled under, and yellow flowers arranged singly or in small groups in leaf axils. It was first formally described in 1859 by Ferdinand von Mueller in Transactions of the Philosophical Institute of Victoria.

This mirbelia occurs in eastern Queensland and is listed as "least concern" under the Queensland Government Nature Conservation Act 1992.

References

Mirbelioids
aotoides
Fabales of Australia
Flora of Queensland
Taxa named by Ferdinand von Mueller
Plants described in 1859